The Kannagawa Hydropower Plant (神流川発電所) is an under construction pumped-storage hydroelectric power plant near Minamiaiki in Nagano Prefecture and Ueno in Gunma Prefecture, Japan. The power plant utilizes the Minamiaiki River along with an upper and lower reservoir created by two dams, the upper Minamiaiki Dam and the lower Ueno Dam. Unit 1 commenced commercial operation in 2005 and Unit 2 in 2012. When completed, the plant will have the second-largest (after Bath County Pumped Storage Station) pumped-storage power capacity in the world.

Construction
In July 1993, the Kannagawa Hydropower Field Survey Office was initiated and in July 1995, the power plant was approved by the Electric Power Development Coordination Council. In May 1997, construction on the project began and by October 2003, the area behind the Ueno Dam was being inundated with water and the next year, the Minamiaiki Dam's reservoir began to fill as well. Both dams were completed and the upper reservoir was filled by 2004. The first generator was commissioned on 22 December 2005 and the second on 7 June 2012. The remaining units 3-6 are scheduled for commissioning by 2032.

Power station
It will contain 6 x 470 MW pump generators for a total capacity of 2,820 MW. Water from the upper Minamiaiki Reservoir is transferred through the power house and after producing electricity, it is brought to the lower Ueno Reservoir. The pump-generators can then pump water from the lower reservoir back up to the upper reservoir for re-use in hydroelectric power production.

Dams

See also

 List of power stations in Japan
 Hydroelectricity in Japan

References

Energy infrastructure completed in 2005
Energy infrastructure completed in 2012
Pumped-storage hydroelectric power stations in Japan
Tokyo Electric Power Company